Sven Thieme (born 8 February 1968) is a Namibian businessman. He is currently a chairman of Ohlthaver & List , the largest private company in Namibia.

Education and training
Thieme attended Deutsche Höhere Privatschule Windhoek and graduated with the German Abitur in 1987. He graduated as an auditor in 1991 at the University of Cape Town, South Africa. He completed his articles at Deloitte & Touche in Cape Town.

Business career
He took over in 2002 after the death of his grandfather and son of the company founder Werner List the CEO of Ohlthaver & List. He has worked since 1998 in the company; 2001 to 2002 as general manager. He also sits several supervisory boards of subsidiaries. Previously, he was from 1994 to 1998 as an auditor for Deloitte & Touche in Luxemburg. In 2004, he was in charge of establishing the Development Bank of Namibia. In 2010 Thieme was in the Supervisory Board of the public broadcaster Namibian Broadcasting Corporation. Since 2014 he presided over the Namibia Chamber of Commerce and Industry. He is considered as one of the most influential Namibians.

Recognition
Thieme was conferred the Most Distinguished Order of Namibia: First Class on Heroes' Day 2014.

References

External links
Mr Sven Thieme, Ohlthaver & List  
SVEN THIEME: The simplicity in complexity. Prime Focus Magazine, November 2010

1968 births
Living people
Namibian businesspeople
University of Cape Town alumni